John Pitann Kinsella (born August 26, 1952) is an American former competition swimmer, an Olympic champion, and a former world record-holder in multiple events.

Kinsella was a standout at Illinois swimming powerhouse Hinsdale Central High School in the late 1960s. As a 16-year-old, he was the silver medalist in the men's 1,500-meter freestyle at the 1968 Summer Olympics in Mexico City, finishing second to U.S. teammate Mike Burton.

In 1970, while still a high school senior swimming for the Hinsdale McDonald's Swim Club under coach Don Watson, he was awarded the Amateur Athletic Union's James E. Sullivan Award in recognition of the outstanding American amateur athlete of the year. In 1970 he also became the first person to swim 1,500 meters under 16 minutes. After graduating from high school, Kinsella, together with Mark Spitz, Gary Hall Sr., and other notable swimmers, were part of Doc Counsilman's legendary Indiana Hoosiers swimming and diving team at Indiana University, which dominated men's college swimming in the early 1970s. Kinsella won NCAA national championships in the 500-yard and 1,650-yard freestyle events in 1971, 1972, and 1973.

At the 1972 Summer Olympics in Munich, Germany, Kinsella won a gold medal as a member of the winning U.S. team in the men's 4×200-meter freestyle relay. The first-place team of Kinsella, Fred Tyler, Steve Genter, and Mark Spitz set a new world-record time of 7:35.78 in the event final.

After graduating from Indiana University, Kinsella went on to swim professionally, setting a time record for swimming the English Channel. He was inducted into the International Swimming Hall of Fame as an "Honor Swimmer" in recognition for his Olympic performances and later professional swimming career where he achieved the title of "World's Professional Champion."

After the end of his competition swimming career, Kinsella attended Harvard Business School. He joined RBC Dain Rauscher as an investment officer, but is no longer with the firm. He currently resides in Illinois. He has a daughter and three sons.

See also

 List of Indiana University (Bloomington) people
 List of Olympic medalists in swimming (men)
 World record progression 400 metres freestyle
 World record progression 1500 metres freestyle
 World record progression 4 × 200 metres freestyle relay

References

External links

 
 

1952 births
Living people
American male freestyle swimmers
World record setters in swimming
Harvard Business School alumni
Indiana Hoosiers men's swimmers
James E. Sullivan Award recipients
Olympic gold medalists for the United States in swimming
Olympic silver medalists for the United States in swimming
People from Hinsdale, Illinois
Swimmers at the 1968 Summer Olympics
Swimmers at the 1972 Summer Olympics
Medalists at the 1972 Summer Olympics
Medalists at the 1968 Summer Olympics